The S-Train is a reserved-seat Commuter Liner train service operated mainly by Seibu Railway, along with Tokyo Metro, Tokyu Corporation, and Yokohama Minatomirai Railway.

Summary 
S-Train service was first announced by the four operating companies on 16 June 2016, with further details being given on 10 January 2017. The service is centered on Seibu Railway, and uses their 40000 series trains. Within the four operating companies, the S-Train is the first-ever reserved-seat train to operate on the Tokyu and Minatomirai railways.

The name "S-Train" was used by the 4 companies during trademark registration on 21 November 2016, and has been trademarked since 21 April 2017 (No. 5941839). The "S" in "S-Train" stands for the following:

 Scene: Used in different scenarios, like commuting to work, going to school or going on outings
 Seat: Comfortable reserved seats
 Seamless: Seamless journey thanks to through service without interchange
 Seibu 

The four terms above all start with the letter "S", hence the name "S-Train".

The logo has three different colours, each with unique meanings. The upper part of the "S" is coloured green, signifying the greenery alongside the Chichibu Line; the lower part of the "S" is coloured blue, signifying the Minatomirai Line, whose signature colour is also blue; and the text "S-TRAIN" is grey, signifying the urbanisation around Shibuya and Toyosu, which the train serves. 

In terms of service type, the S-Train is uniquely positioned. It is positioned lower than Seibu's limited express (the Red Arrow) on the Seibu service hierarchy, but is placed higher than Tokyu's limited express (which does not charge extra fees) in Tokyu's service hierarchy.

 Services 
Train operation differs between weekdays and weekends. 

The direction is denoted by "Up" and "Down", where trains for Toyosu or Motomachi-Chukagai are "up" and trains for Chichibu or Tokorozawa are "down". This is based on Seibu's standards, in which southbound services are "up", and northbound services are "down". The S-Train follows Seibu's standards because it is the main operator of the service. A further reason for using Seibu's standards is to prevent confusion, as Tokyo Metro and Tokyu use reversed denotations of service direction compared to Seibu.

Since all seats on the S-Train are reserved, there are special conductors (specially called "Train Crew" within Tokyu sections) to make sure passengers have purchased seat reservations. Because of this, the S-Train differs from regular Tokyo Metro services, as all S-Train services use driver-only operation.

 Weekdays 
On weekdays, S-Trains operate mainly to serve commuters. They run between Tokorozawa and Toyosu, on the Seibu Ikebukuro and Yurakucho Lines, and the Tokyo Metro Yurakucho Line.

There are 6 Toyosu-bound trains and 5 Tokorozawa-bound trains every weekday. S-Trains operate during the evening rush hours, except for one Toyosu-bound train which operates in early morning.

The biggest feature of the weekday S-Trains is that it skips Ikebukuro Station, which is a core transfer terminal on the Seibu Ikebukuro and Tokyo Metro Yurakucho Lines, and is Tokyo Metro's busiest station. Another feature is that it operates as a limited stop service within the Tokyo Metro Yurakucho Line.

S-Trains stop at Tokorozawa, Hoya, Shakujii-Koen on the Seibu Ikebukuro Line, and at Iidabashi, Yurakucho, Toyosu on the Tokyo Metro Yurakucho Line.

 Weekends 
On weekends, S-Train services operate mainly to serve visitors. They run between Seibu-Chichibu and Motomachi-Chukagai, on the Seibu Chichibu and Yurakucho Lines, the Tokyo Metro Fukutoshin Line, the Tokyu Toyoko Line, and the Minatomirai Line.

There are 2 southbound trains (one originating from Seibu-Chichibu, the other from Hanno, all for Motomachi-Chukagai), and 3 northbound trains (one to Tokorozawa, one to Hanno, and one for Seibu-Chichibu, all originating from Motomachi-Chukagai) per day on weekends.

The southbound train from Hanno and the northbound train to Seibu-Chichibu are the only weekend S-Trains that operate in the morning. All other S-Trains operate in the evening.

Passengers cannot board S-Trains at Ikebukuro.

 Stations served 

 Weekdays Legend ◯ : Stops
 △ : Stops, boarding for northbound trains only
 ▽ : Stops, boarding for southbound trains only
 ◇ : Stops, alighting for northbound trains only
 ※ : Brief stop, no boarding or alighting

 Weekends Legend'''

 ◯ : Stops
 △ : Stops, boarding for northbound trains only
 ▽ : Stops, boarding for southbound trains only
 ◇ : Stops, alighting only
 ※ : Brief stop, no boarding or alighting

Rolling stock 

 Seibu 40000 series 10-car EMUs

See also 

F Liner, a similar service to the weekend S-Train

References

External links 

 S-TRAIN - Yokohama Minatomirai Railway
 S-TRAIN - Tokyu 
 S-TRAIN - Seibu Railway

Seibu Railway
Tokyo Metro
Minatomirai Line
Named passenger trains of Japan
Railway services introduced in 2017